Tieme Klompe (born 8 April 1976) is a Dutch former footballer who played as a defender for Eredivisie clubs SC Heerenveen, RKC Waalwijk and FC Groningen.

Club career
Klompe started his career at SC Heerenveen, where he was a first-team player for eight seasons. During his time at Heerenveen, the club reached the final of the KNVB Cup (1996–97) and finished as runners-up in the Eredivisie (1999–2000), the latter resulting in qualification for the Champions League group stage (2000–01).

In the summer of 2004, Klompe moved to RKC Waalwijk, where he was released a year later, having made two appearances. He then signed an amateur contract with FC Groningen. After making one appearance, he announced his retirement on 24 October 2005. He cited the many injuries he struggled with during his career as the reason for his decision.

International career
In 1998, Klompe was selected for the Netherlands national under-21 team, making his first appearance on 18 February against Portugal. He was subsequently part of the Netherlands squad at the final stages of the 1998 UEFA European Under-21 Championship in Romania, appearing in one match as the team finished in fourth place.

Coaching career
After some years as a youth coach for SC Heerenveen, the club announced on 22 November 2012, that he had been promoted to the first team as assistant manager of Marco van Basten. In the 2014/15 season, he was also the manager of their reserve team/U21's. At the end of August 2016, he was hired as assistant manager for Netherlands' U20 national team alongside his role at Heerenveen. He left the club at the end of the 2016/17 season.

Tieme was appointed manager of Harkemase Boys for the 2018/19 season. However, he resigned on 29 April 2019.

References

1976 births
Living people
Dutch footballers
Association football defenders
Netherlands under-21 international footballers
SC Heerenveen players
RKC Waalwijk players
FC Groningen players
Eredivisie players
People from Noordenveld
Footballers from Drenthe
SC Heerenveen non-playing staff